HNLMS Prins Hendrik der Nederlanden was an ironclad ramtorenschip (turret ram ship) built in Great Britain for the Royal Netherlands Navy in the mid-1860s. She was transferred to the Dutch East Indies in 1876 and participated in the Dutch intervention in Lombok and Karangasem in 1894. The ship was hulked in 1899 and scrapped in 1925.

Design and description

HNLMS Prins Hendrik der Nederlanden was ordered from Laird & Son Co. by the Royal Netherlands Navy as an enlarged version of the  turret ships originally ordered by the Confederate States Navy. The gun turrets was normally rotated by two men via a system of gears; 20 seconds were required for a full 360° rotation if a full crew of 19 men was used. The ship's bow was reinforced to act as a ram and a hurricane deck connected the forecastle and poop decks.

She displaced . The iron hull was divided by five watertight bulkheads and the ship had a double bottom beneath the engine and boiler rooms. Her crew consisted of 230 officers and men.

Propulsion
Prins Hendrik der Nederlanden had two horizontal return connecting rod compound steam engines, built by Lairds, each driving a single  propeller. The engines were powered by four square boilers. She carried  of coal and was barque-rigged with three masts. Her fore and mainmasts were supported by tripods to reduce interference with the firing arcs of the gun turrets by the ship's rigging.

Armament
The ship mounted a pair of Armstrong  rifled muzzle-loading guns in each gun turret. Two Krupp produced 12 cm K.A. breech-loading guns were fitted in the forecastle and another pair in the poop as chase guns. Six  Hotchkiss 5-barrel revolving guns were added shortly after completion. They had a rate of fire of about 30 rounds per minute

Armor
The deck was unarmored.
http://resolver.kb.nl/resolve?urn=sgd:18741875:0001253:pdf

Service
Prins Hendrik der Nederlanden was laid down by Laird & Son Co. at Birkenhead in August 1865. She was launched on 9 October 1866 and completed in March 1867. Before being sent to the Dutch East Indies she was tasked with the defence of the Dutch Navy main harbour at Den Helder. The ship was transferred to the Dutch East Indies in 1876 and served in the Auxiliary squadron.

She was absent from Java from 25 November 1879 until 24 February 1880 for repairs to her boilers that were leaking at Singapore.

In late June 1881 she temporally replaced Zeeland as  guard ship at Batavia. On 25 January 1882 she entered Onrust Dock of 5,000 tons at Onrust Island. On 1 February 1882 she was sent to Cirebon but due to the outbreak of cholera the ship was recalled after a few days and send to Riau for practice from which she returned on 20 March that year in Batavia.
From 16 to 25 May 1882 she practised at Tanjung Priok and made a visit to the Thousand Islands. In June that year she left for Surabaya where she received new boilers.

After practicing in August 1883 she protect shipping in the Sunda Strait and made a trip to the shores of Banten and Lampung after the eruption of the volcano Krakatoa. 13 November 1883 until 24 January 1884 she served as guard ship at Batavia.

She was fitted with a Spar torpedo system in 1885.
Later that year she was repaired at Surabaya and after that again sent to Makassar for practice.

From 24 January 1890 until 2 December 1891 she was attached to the naval force stationed on the north coast of Aceh.
In 1893 she was attached to the naval force east of Java and Borneo. This lasted until early August 1896.

The 37-millimeter guns were replaced by two quick-firing,  guns and four 37-millimeter quick-firers by 1890. Prins Hendrik der Nederlanden transported troops during the Dutch intervention in Lombok and Karangasem in July 1894.
She transported the lord of Lombok and his family in late 1894 to Batavia after they were taken prisoner.
In August 1897 she participated in an expedition to Segli.

The ship decommissioned on 5 May 1899 and became an ammunition hulk in Surabaya. She was transferred to the Department of Colonies between 1901 and 1905, but returned to the Navy in 1905. Prins Hendrik der Nederlanden was scrapped in 1925.

Notes

Footnotes

Citations

References

 
 
Staatsbegrooting voor het dienstjaar 1875 (2. 32.)
Colonial reports:
Koloniaal verslag van 1877 (Bijlage C 5.10)
Koloniaal verslag van 1880 (Bijlage C 5.9)
Koloniaal verslag van 1881 (Bijlage C 5.8)
Koloniaal verslag van 1882 (Bijlage C 5.9)
Koloniaal verslag van 1883 (Bijlage C 5.8)
Koloniaal verslag van 1884 (Bijlage C 5.8)
Koloniaal verslag van 1885 (Bijlage C 5.7)
Koloniaal verslag van 1888 (Bijlage C 5.9)
Koloniaal verslag van 1890 (Bijlage C 5.8)
Koloniaal verslag van 1891 (Bijlage C 5.8)
Koloniaal verslag van 1892 (Bijlage C 5.10)
Koloniaal verslag van 1894 (Bijlage C 5.9)
Koloniaal verslag van 1895 (Bijlage C 5.10)
Koloniaal verslag van 1896 (Bijlage C 5.9)
Koloniaal verslag van 1897 (Bijlage C 5.8)
Koloniaal verslag van 1898 (Bijlage C 5.4)

19th-century naval ships of the Netherlands
1866 ships